Stephan Brenninkmeijer (born 27 June 1964 in Doorwerth) is a Dutch film director, screenwriter, and producer.

Life and career
Brenninkmeijer was born and raised at Doorwerth Castle, Netherlands, where his father G.H. Brenninkmeijer was owner of the Michelin starred Restaurant Beaulieu.

At the age of 8 his family moved to Apeldoorn. From 1988 to 1992 he studied at the Netherlands Film Academy in Amsterdam. Although aiming to direct feature films, he first focused on storytelling through editing.

In 1992, he started his professional career editing television series and films. As an editor he worked with Dutch directors like Academy Award winner Mike van Diem.

He directed his first feature film in 2000, The Silence of the Soul, which won a "Golden Crown" Award at the ICVM festival in Atlanta, United States.

The same year he co-directed the TV series Westenwind which won the Televizierring.

In 2002 he wrote, produced and directed the motion picture Swingers, a controversial low-budget production that had theatrical releases in the Benelux countries and was sold internationally.

In 2011 he wrote, produced and directed the feature film Caged. Caged was picked up by Anderson Digital for US home theatre release in February 2013.

In 2012 Brenninkmeijer participated in the user-generated project Entertainment Experience with Paul Verhoeven to make his version on the user-generated script. Both Verhoeven's film (called Tricked) and Brenninkmeijers Lotgenoten (Counterparts) were to be released in the Netherlands in March 2013. The Entertainment Experience tv-show won an International Emmy Award 2013.

Filmography

Feature films

Short films

TV series

Trivia
Named his son Timo, a tribute to Joep Sertons' character in Swingers.
Related to the famous Brenninkmeijer clan, the richest family in the Netherlands known from the C&A international chain of clothes stores.

References

External links
 
 
 

1964 births
Living people
Dutch film directors
Dutch film editors
Dutch screenwriters
Dutch male screenwriters
People from Renkum